Stenus is a genus of semiaquatic rove beetles in the subfamily Steninae, and one of the largest genus in the kingdom Animalia, with some 2700 known species worldwide (only the beetle genus Agrilus is comparable in size). They are predators of Collembola and other small arthropods. Adults have a protrusible labium with a sticky tip used in prey capture. To overcome the rapid escape of Collembola, the labium is protruded at high speed (1-3 ms in Stenus comma) by hemolymph pressure, and immediately withdrawn (withdrawn in 30-40 ms in Stenus comma), pulling the prey within the range of the mandibles. However, the labium tip does not easily stick to preys covered in scales or setae or that have a large body size. Stenus comma is more likely to catch such preys by lunging forward and grabbing them directly with its mandibles rather than using its labium. Stenus species are also known for "skimming" on the water surface using their pygidial gland secretions that act as a surfactant and rapidly propel the beetle fast forward, a phenomenon known as the Marangoni effect. Stenus comma has been seen to achieve a velocity of 0.75 m/s, and to cover a distance of up to 15 m
if the secretion is continuous.

Selected Species

 Stenus adelops Casey, 1884
 Stenus adspector Maklin, 1852
 Stenus advena (Casey, 1884)
 Stenus agnatus (Casey, 1884)
 Stenus alacer Casey, 1884
 Stenus alpicola Fauvel, 1872
 Stenus alveolatus Casey, 1884
 Stenus amabilis (Casey, 1884)
 Stenus amicus Casey, 1884
 Stenus amplifacatus Benick, 1921
 Stenus angustus Casey, 1884
 Stenus animatus Casey, 1884
 Stenus annularis Erichson, 1840
 Stenus arculus Casey, 1840
 Stenus argus Gravenhorst, 1806
 Stenus arizonae Casey, 1884
 Stenus artus Casey, 1884
 Stenus austini Casey, 1884
 Stenus bakeri Bernhauer, 1910
 Stenus biguttatus (Linnaeus, 1758)
 Stenus bilentigatus Casey, 1884
 Stenus bipunctatus Erichson, 1839
 Stenus biwenxuani Tang & Li, 2013
 Stenus caenicolus Notman, 1919
 Stenus californicus Casey, 1884
 Stenus callosus Erichson, 1840
 Stenus canadensis (Casey, 1884)
 Stenus canaliculatus Gyllenhal, 1827
 Stenus capucinus Boheman, 1858
 Stenus cariniceps Maklin, 1852
 Stenus carinicollis Casey, 1884
 Stenus carolinae Casey, 1884
 Stenus carolinus Bernhauer, 1917
 Stenus chalybeus Boheman, 1858
 Stenus chapini Blackwelder, 1943
 Stenus colon Say, 1834
 Stenus colonus Erichson, 1840
 Stenus comma LeConte 1863
 Stenus convictor Casey, 1884
 Stenus corvus Casey, 1884
 Stenus costalis Casey, 1884
 Stenus croceatus (Casey, 1884)
 Stenus cubanus Blackwelder, 1943
 Stenus cubensis Bernhauer, 1910
 Stenus curtus Casey, 1884
 Stenus delawarensis Casey, 1884
 Stenus dispar Casey, 1884
 Stenus dissentiens Casey, 1884
 Stenus dives Casey, 1884
 Stenus dolosus Casey, 1884
 Stenus dyeri Blackwelder, 1943
 Stenus edax Notman, 1920
 Stenus ellipticus Casey, 1884
 Stenus eriensis Casey, 1884
 Stenus erythropus Melsheimer, 1844
 Stenus exasperatus Benick, 1925
 Stenus exploratus Fall, 1926
 Stenus falli Scheerpeltz, 1933
 Stenus femoratus Say, 1834
 Stenus flavicornis Erichson, 1840
 Stenus floridanus Casey, 1884
 Stenus fraternus (Casey, 1884)
 Stenus frigidus Falls, 1926
 Stenus fulvoguttatus Notman, 1920
 Stenus gemmeus Casey, 1884
 Stenus gibbicollis Sahlberg, 1880
 Stenus gilae Casey, 1884
 Stenus gratiosus Casey, 1884
 Stenus gravidus Casey, 1884
 Stenus haitiensis Blackwelder, 1943
 Stenus hirsutus Casey, 1884
 Stenus hispaniolus Blackwelder, 1943
 Stenus hubbardi Casey, 1884
 Stenus immarginatus Mäklin, 1853
 Stenus incertus Casey, 1884
 Stenus incultus Casey, 1884
 Stenus indigens Casey, 1884
 Stenus ingratus Casey, 1884
 Stenus inornatus Casey, 1884
 Stenus insignis Casey, 1884
 Stenus integer Casey, 1884
 Stenus intrusus Casey, 1884
 Stenus juno (Paykull, 1789)
 Stenus juvencus Casey, 1884
 Stenus laetulus (Casey, 1884)
 Stenus leviceps Casey, 1884
 Stenus limatulus Benick, 1928
 Stenus liupanshanus Tang & Li, 2013
 Stenus luctuosus Casey, 1884
 Stenus luculentus Casey, 1884
 Stenus lugens Casey, 1884
 Stenus lutzi Notman, 1920
 Stenus maritimus Motschulsky, 1845
 Stenus megalops (Casey, 1884)
 Stenus mendax Casey, 1884
 Stenus meridionalis (Casey, 1884)
 Stenus militaris Casey, 1884
 Stenus minor Casey, 1884
 Stenus montanus Casey, 1884
 Stenus monticola Casey, 1884
 Stenus morio Gravenhorst, 1806
 Stenus mundulus Casey, 1884
 Stenus murphyanus Bernhauer, 1917
 Stenus nanus Stephens, 1833
 Stenus neglectus Casey, 1884
 Stenus nimbosus Casey, 1884
 Stenus nitescens (Casey, 1884)
 Stenus noctivagus Casey, 1884
 Stenus obstrusus Casey, 1884
 Stenus occidentalis Casey, 1884
 Stenus odius Blackwelder, 1943
 Stenus pacificus Casey, 1884
 Stenus papagonis (Casey, 1884)
 Stenus parallelus Casey, 1884
 Stenus pauper Casey, 1884
 Stenus pauperculus Casey, 1884
 Stenus perexilis Notman, 1920
 Stenus personatus Benick, 1928
 Stenus pertinax (Casey, 1884)
 Stenus pettiti Casey, 1884
 Stenus pinguis (Casey, 1884)
 Stenus placidus Casey, 1884
 Stenus plicipennis (Casey, 1884)
 Stenus pluto Casey, 1884
 Stenus pollens (Casey, 1884)
 Stenus pterobrachys Gemminger & Harold, 1868
 Stenus pudicus Casey, 1884
 Stenus pugetensis Casey, 1884
 Stenus pumilio Erichson, 1839
 Stenus punctatus Erichson, 1840
 Stenus punctiger Casey, 1884
 Stenus ranops Casey, 1884
 Stenus renifer LeConte, 1863
 Stenus retrusus (Casey, 1884)
 Stenus rugifer Casey, 1884
 Stenus sayi (Casey, 1884)
 Stenus scabiosus Casey, 1884
 Stenus schwarzi Casey, 1884
 Stenus sculptilis Casey, 1884
 Stenus sectator Casey, 1884
 Stenus sectilifer Casey, 1884
 Stenus semicolon LeConte, 1863
 Stenus shoshonis Casey, 1884
 Stenus similiatus Blatchley, 1910
 Stenus simplex Casey, 1884
 Stenus solutus Erichson 1840
 Stenus sphaerops Casey, 1884
 Stenus strangulatus Casey, 1884
 Stenus stygicus Say, 1834
 Stenus subtilis Casey, 1884
 Stenus tacomae Casey, 1884
 Stenus tahoensis Casey,1884
 Stenus tarsalis Ljungh, 1804
 Stenus tenuis Casey, 1884
 Stenus terricola Casey, 1884
 Stenus teter Notman, 1920
 Stenus texanus Casey, 1884
 Stenus torus Benick, 1925
 Stenus trajectus (Casey, 1884)
 Stenus tristis Casey, 1884
 Stenus tuberculatus Casey, 1884
 Stenus utenis Casey, 1884
 Stenus vacuus Casey, 1884
 Stenus venustus Casey, 1884
 Stenus verticosus Casey, 1884
 Stenus vespertinus Casey, 1884
 Stenus vestalis Casey, 1884
 Stenus vexatus Casey, 1884
 Stenus vicinus Casey, 1884
 Stenus villosus Casey, 1884
 Stenus vinnulus Casey, 1884
 Stenus vista Sanderson, 1946
 Stenus zunicus'' Casey, 1884

References

Steninae
Beetles described in 1796